Tanka Prasad Sharma Kadel is a Nepalese politician. He was elected to the Pratinidhi Sabha in the 1999 election on behalf of the Nepali Congress.

References

Year of birth missing (living people)
Living people
Nepali Congress politicians from Gandaki Province
Nepal MPs 1999–2002